West Ward School may refer to:

 West Ward School (Gas City, Indiana), National Register of Historic Places-listed in Grant County
 West Ward School (Wakefield, Massachusetts)

See also
Ward School (disambiguation)